Loerch is an unincorporated community in Oak Lawn Township, Crow Wing County, Minnesota, United States, near Brainerd. It is along Loerch Road near Dullum Road.

References

Unincorporated communities in Crow Wing County, Minnesota
Unincorporated communities in Minnesota